Inspector Ganesh  Ghote (pronounced GO-tay) is a fictional police officer who is the main character in H. R. F. Keating's detective novels. Ghote is an inspector in the police force of Bombay (a.k.a. Mumbai), India.

Overview
Ghote first appeared in the novel The Perfect Murder (1964), in which his investigation of the apparent murder of the Parsi, Mr Perfect, was assisted informally by the Swedish UNESCO analyst Axel Svensson. The novel, which Keating wrote without ever having been to India, won a Crime Writers' Association Gold Dagger Award and was adapted into a film in 1988 by Merchant Ivory.

H. R. F. Keating intended Ghote's final appearance to be in the novel Breaking and Entering (2000), in which he was reunited with Axel Svensson as he investigated a series of cat burglaries that ultimately enabled him to solve the high-profile murder that was occupying the rest of his colleagues. Since that time, however, Keating has written Inspector Ghote's First Case (2008) and A Small Case For Inspector Ghote? (2009).

Ghote's father appears in the novel The Murder of the Maharajah (1980). Ghote is married; his wife, Protima, is a beautiful, spirited, and argumentative, though loving, Bengali. They have a son, Ved, invariably referred to in the earlier novels as "little Ved". In most novels, Ghote finds that he has to spend almost as much time fighting the Indian criminal justice system bureaucracy as he does in fighting criminals. He also tends to get little respect from the often rich and powerful people he must investigate in connection with his work, though in the end he typically wins the day through sheer doggedness. In these characteristics, he has been compared to the American fictional detective Columbo.

Adaptations
The noted actor Naseeruddin Shah played the role of Ghote in The Perfect Murder. Ghote also appeared in a BBC adaptation of Inspector Ghote Hunts the Peacock, played by Zia Mohyeddin. The same novel was again adapted by the BBC this time as a radio drama starring Sam Dastor.

In May 2020, Endemol Shine India was announced to adapt the novels for Television.

List of books
The Perfect Murder (1964, CWA Gold Dagger Award winner)
Inspector Ghote's Good Crusade (1966)
Inspector Ghote Caught in Meshes (1967)
Inspector Ghote Hunts the Peacock (1968)
Inspector Ghote Plays a Joker (1969)
Inspector Ghote Breaks an Egg (1970)
Inspector Ghote Goes By Train (1971)
Inspector Ghote Trusts the Heart (1972)
Bats Fly Up for Inspector Ghote (1974)
Filmi, Filmi, Inspector Ghote (1976)
Inspector Ghote Draws a Line (1979)
The Murder of the Maharajah (1980, CWA Gold Dagger Award winner)
Go West Inspector Ghote (1981)
The Sheriff of Bombay (1984)
Under a Monsoon Cloud (1986)
The Body in the Billiard Room (1987)
Dead on Time (1988)
The Iciest Sin (1990)
Inspector Ghote, His Life and Crimes (1989); short story collection
Cheating Death (1992)
Doing Wrong (1993)
Asking Questions (1996)
Bribery, Corruption Also (1999)
Breaking and Entering (2000)
Inspector Ghote's First Case (2008)
A Small Case for Inspector Ghote? (2009)

Notes

External links
 Mumbai Police

Ghote, Inspector Ganesh
Mumbai in fiction
Ghote, Inspector Ganesh
Crime novel series
British detective novels
British mystery novels
Novels set in Mumbai